Nymphargus pluvialis is a species of frog in the family Centrolenidae. It is known from the area of its type locality, Pistipata, Río Umasbamba, in the Huayopata District of the Cusco Region of Peru as well as La Paz, Bolivia. Its common name is Pistipata cochran frog, although it no longer is included in the genus Cochranella.

Description
Male Nymphargus pluvialis measure  in snout–vent length. Snout is truncate. Dorsal skin has warts and spinules.

Habitat and conservation
Nymphargus pluvialis is only known from close to streams in montane and cloud forests, or, as was the case with the type locality, coffee and tea plantation with remnants of cloud forest. Individuals are calling during rainy nights from herbaceous plants on very wet cliffs and the upper sides of leaves over water adjacent to streams. Eggs are laid in clutches on the tips of the upper surfaces of the leaves. The tadpoles develop in streams.

References

pluvialis
Amphibians of the Andes
Amphibians of Bolivia
Amphibians of Peru
Amphibians described in 1982
Taxa named by William Edward Duellman
Taxonomy articles created by Polbot